Sentimental Education is an 1869 novel by Gustave Flaubert.

Sentimental Education may also refer to:

Sentimental Education (Sneaky Feelings album), 1987
Sentimental Education (Free Kitten album), 1997
"Sentimental Education" (The Sopranos), an episode of the TV series The Sopranos
Sentimental Education (film), a 1962 French film directed by Alexandre Astruc
A Sentimental Education (Rod Jones album), 2010
A Sentimental Education (Luna album), 2017
Educação Sentimental, a 1985 album by Brazilian rock group Kid Abelha
"Educação Sentimental (songs)", two songs that serve as the title tracks to the album mentioned above